Enrique Penabella (born 24 November 1938) is a Cuban fencer. He competed in the individual foil and sabre events at the 1964 Summer Olympics.

References

1938 births
Living people
Cuban male fencers
Olympic fencers of Cuba
Fencers at the 1964 Summer Olympics
Pan American Games medalists in fencing
Pan American Games bronze medalists for Cuba
Medalists at the 1967 Pan American Games
Fencers at the 1967 Pan American Games